Kouamé Ali Martial Ouattara (born 6 June 1991) is an Ivorian professional footballer who plays as a midfielder.

Club career

Gatineau
In 2016, Ouattara signed with Première Ligue de soccer du Québec side FC Gatineau. He made four appearances before suffering an injury which forced him to leave the club and return to Moncton.

HFX Wanderers
In September 2018, Ouattara participated in the Canadian Premier League Open Trials in Halifax. On 21 February 2019, Ouattara signed with CPL side HFX Wanderers and made his debut as a substitute in the club's inaugural match on 28 April 2019. On 14 December 2019, the club announced that Ouattara would not be returning for the 2020 season.

References

External links

1991 births
Living people
Association football midfielders
Ivorian footballers
Soccer people from New Brunswick
Sportspeople from Moncton
Ivorian expatriate footballers
Expatriate soccer players in Canada
Ivorian expatriate sportspeople in Canada
Université de Moncton alumni
HFX Wanderers FC players
Première ligue de soccer du Québec players
Canadian Premier League players
FC Gatineau players